Clio (pronounced CLY-oh) is a town in Marlboro County, South Carolina, United States. The population was 726 at the 2010 census. Marlboro School of Discovery is a magnet school in Clio, South Carolina and is part of the Marlboro County School District.

History
The Clio Historic District, McLaurin House, and McLaurin-Roper-McColl Farmstead are listed on the National Register of Historic Places.

Geography
Clio is located at  (34.579921, -79.543401).

Demographics

As of the census of 2000, there were 774 people, 302 households, and 192 families residing in the town. The population density was 926.4 people per square mile (355.8/km2). There were 339 housing units at an average density of 405.8 per square mile (155.8/km2). The racial makeup of the town was 36.05% White, 57.11% African American, 6.20% Native American, 0.13% from other races, and 0.52% from two or more races. Hispanic or Latino of any race were 0.52% of the population.

There were 302 households, out of which 26.8% had children under the age of 18 living with them, 34.1% were married couples living together, 25.5% had a female householder with no husband present, and 36.1% were non-families. 33.8% of all households were made up of individuals, and 15.6% had someone living alone who was 65 years of age or older. The average household size was 2.56 and the average family size was 3.30.

In the town, the population was spread out, with 27.0% under the age of 18, 6.7% from 18 to 24, 26.4% from 25 to 44, 26.2% from 45 to 64, and 13.7% who were 65 years of age or older. The median age was 37 years. For every 100 females, there were 84.3 males. For every 100 females age 18 and over, there were 74.9 males.

The median income for a household in the town was $25,313, and the median income for a family was $31,875. Males had a median income of $26,364 versus $18,092 for females. The per capita income for the town was $14,215. About 23.0% of families and 28.9% of the population were below the poverty line, including 39.1% of those under age 18 and 21.3% of those age 65.

References

External links
 

Towns in Marlboro County, South Carolina
Towns in South Carolina